Korlagunta is a village in Krishna district of the Indian state of Andhra Pradesh. It is located in Musunuru mandal of Nuzvid revenue division.

See also 
Musunuru mandal

References 

Villages in Krishna district